Lake Township is a township in Hall County, Nebraska, in the United States.

History
It was organized in 1881.

References

Townships in Hall County, Nebraska